
Year 310 (CCCX) was a common year starting on Sunday (link will display the full calendar) of the Julian calendar. At the time, it was known as the Year of the Consulship of Andronicus and Probus (or, less frequently, year 1063 Ab urbe condita). The denomination 310 for this year has been used since the early medieval period, when the Anno Domini calendar era became the prevalent method in Europe for naming years.

Events 
 By place 

 Roman Empire 
 Maximian, retired emperor, rebels against Constantine I in Arles while the latter is campaigning against the Franks.
 Maximinus Daza, caesar under Emperor Galerius, is acclaimed augustus by his troops. Galerius is forced to recognize him as co-ruler of the East. The Roman Empire is thus divided between seven simultaneous emperors: Galerius (East), Maximinus II (East), Licinius (Middle), Constantine I (West), Maximian (West), Maxentius (Italy), and Domitius Alexander (Africa).
 July – Maximian flees to Marseille where he is besieged and surrenders. Constantine encourages his suicide and Maximian, age 60, hangs himself. Emperor Maxentius condemns the killing of his father.
 Licinius campaigns with success against the Carpi.

 Asia 
 Haelhae becomes the king of the Korean kingdom of Silla.

 By topic 

 Commerce 
 At Trier, Constantine orders the minting of a new coin, the solidus, in an effort to offset the declining value of the denarius and bring stability to the imperial currency by restoring a gold standard. The solidus (later known as the bezant) will be minted in the Byzantine Empire without change in weight or purity until the 10th century.

 Religion 
 April 18 – Pope Eusebius succeeds Pope Marcellus I as the 31st pope, but is banished on August 17 by the Emperor Maxentius to Sicily, where he dies, perhaps from a hunger strike.

Births 
 Ausonius, Roman poet and rhetorician (d. 395)
 Epiphanius of Salamis, Church Father (d. 403)
 Wulfila, Gothic bishop and missionary (d. 383)

Deaths 

 August 17 – Eusebius, bishop of Rome
 July – Maximian, Roman emperor (b. c. 250)
 Dan, Chinese empress of Xiongnu (or Han Zhao)
 Domnina, Berenice, and Prosdoce, Christian martyrs
 Liu He, Chinese emperor of Xiongnu (or Han Zhao)
 Liu Yuan, Chinese emperor of Xiongnu (or Han Zhao)
Luo Shang, Chinese general of the Jin dynasty (266–420)
 Emperor Ōjin of Japan, according to legend.

References